Argeneh-ye Olya (also Romanized as Argeneh-ye ‘Olyā; also known as Argeneh-ye Bālā) is a village in Gamasiyab Rural District, in the Central District of Sahneh County, Kermanshah Province, Iran. At the 2006 census, its population was 303, in 63 families.

References 

Populated places in Sahneh County